Chah Qil (also Romanized as Chāh Qīl; also known as Chāh Fīl and Chāh Kīl) is a village in Fatuyeh Rural District, in the Central District of Bastak County, Hormozgan Province, Iran. At the 2006 census, its population was 36, in 7 families.

References 

Populated places in Bastak County